Paul van der Veen Does (c. 1660 - 16 August 1733, Gorcum) was from 1696 to 1706 governor of Surinam, succeeding Johan van Scharphuizen. The next twenty-five years, until his death, he was a member of the board of the Society of Surinam.

He was the son of Balthasar van der Veen and Susanna Pels. His uncle was Andries Pels, a rich Amsterdam banker and insurer. He married Anna van Gelre, a mayor's daughter from Zierikzee. His brother-in-law was Andries Boxel.

References

1660 births
1733 deaths
Governors of Suriname
People from Gorinchem